Leonardo dos Santos or Leonardo Santos may refer to:

Leonardo Santos (sailor) (born 1977), Brazilian sailor
Leonardo dos Santos Silva (born 1976), Brazilian footballer
Leonardo Bruno dos Santos Silva, aka China, Brazilian footballer
Leonardo Henrique Peixoto dos Santos (born 1977), Brazilian footballer
Dedê (Leonardo de Deus Santos, born 1978), Brazilian footballer
Léo Fortunato (Leonardo Fortunato dos Santos, born 1983), Brazilian footballer
Leonardo Santos (fighter) (born 1980), Brazilian mixed martial artist
Leonardo Coelho Santos (born 1995), Brazilian swimmer